Pro Duo may refer to:
Memory Stick Pro Duo, a flash memory card format developed by Sony
Radeon Pro Duo, a graphics card released by AMD in 2016